Sheryl Yvonne Kennedy is a former Democratic member of the Michigan House of Representatives.

Career 
Kennedy earned her Ph.D. in Educational Leadership and Administration in 2011. Kennedy became a school administrator, serving as principal in Walled Lake Consolidated School District since 2013.

Kennedy was defeated by David Martin for re-election in 2020.

Kennedy currently serves as the chairperson for the Genesee County Democratic Party.

References

External links 
 Sheryl Kennedy at housedems.org

Living people
Oakland University alumni
Democratic Party members of the Michigan House of Representatives
21st-century American politicians
21st-century American women politicians
Women state legislators in Michigan
Year of birth missing (living people)